Trygve Bruvik (born 1952) is a Norwegian engineer and businessperson.

Bruvik was educated with an engineering degree from Bergen College of Engineering, as well as a business administration degree from BI Norwegian Business School. He worked for Vesta Forsikring from 1981, and was chief executive officer from 1994 to 2002. Since 2003 he has been chair of Marine Farms.

References

1952 births
Living people
Norwegian businesspeople
Norwegian engineers
BI Norwegian Business School alumni
Bergen University College alumni